Rhythm is the variation of the length and accentuation of a series of sounds or other events.

Rhythm may also refer to:

Film
 Rhythm (2000 film), a Tamil-language musical drama film
 Rhythm (2010 film), a Malayalam-language film of 2010
 Rhythm (2016 film), a Hindi-language romance musical film
 Rhythm (upcoming film) a Kannada-language musical drama film

Music
 Rhythm (music magazine), a magazine about drumming
 The Rhythm (radio show), now Classic Hip-Hop, an American syndicated music format

Albums
 Rhythm (album), by Wildbirds & Peacedrums, 2014
 Rhythm, by Luke Vibert, 2008

Songs
 "Rhythm" (song), by Ua, 1996
 "The Rhythm", by MNEK, 2015
 "Rhythm", by Praga Khan from Falling, 2000
 "Rhythm", by Sum 41 from All Killer No Filler, 2001
 "Rhythm", from the Blue's Big Musical Movie soundtrack, 2000
 "The Rhythm", by Mari Wilson, 1991
 "The Rhythm", by Spoons from Talkback, 1983
 "The Rhythm", by XTC from Go 2, 1978

Other
 Rhythm (horse) (1987–2007), an American Thoroughbred racehorse
 Rhythm (linguistics) or isochrony
 Rhythm (liqueur), a citrus flavoured liqueur
 Rhythm (literary magazine), an early 20th-century British magazine
 Rhythm (motor boat), a boat designed by LOMOcean Design
Rhythm Watch, a Japanese watch company.

See also
 
 
 Rythem, a Japanese pop duo
 Rhythm game, a genre of music-themed action video game
 Rhythm guitar, a technique and role within a musical ensemble
 Rhythm of Structure, a multimedia interdisciplinary project founded in 2003
 Rhythm section, a group of musicians within a music ensemble or band that provides the underlying rhythm, harmony and pulse of the accompaniment
 The Rhythm Section, a 2020 action thriller film directed by Reed Morano